Alberto Prada Vega (born 19 January 1989) is a Spanish professional footballer who plays for Austrian club SK Vorwärts Steyr as a left back.

Club career
Prada was born in Ponferrada, León, Castile and León, and represented Real Valladolid as a youth. He made his senior debut with the reserves in 2008, in Segunda División B.

In 2009, Prada joined another reserve team, Real Zaragoza B from Tercera División. On 8 July 2011 he returned to the third level after agreeing to a three-year contract with Zamora CF.

On 21 May 2015, Prada signed for Cádiz CF as a replacement to injured Andrés ahead of the play-offs. He appeared in three matches for the club, before moving to the Austrian Football Bundesliga with SV Ried on 2 July. He made his professional debut 23 days later, coming on as a second-half substitute for Thomas Murg in a 0–3 away loss against SK Rapid Wien; he quickly became a regular starter, and appeared in 27 matches during the campaign.

References

External links

Ried official profile 

1989 births
Living people
People from Ponferrada
Sportspeople from the Province of León
Spanish footballers
Footballers from Castile and León
Association football defenders
Segunda División B players
Tercera División players
Real Valladolid Promesas players
Real Zaragoza B players
Zamora FC players
Cádiz CF players
Austrian Football Bundesliga players
2. Liga (Austria) players
SV Ried players
SC Wiener Neustadt players
SK Vorwärts Steyr players
Spanish expatriate footballers
Expatriate footballers in Austria
Spanish expatriate sportspeople in Austria